Qajariyeh-ye Do (also Romanized as Qajarīyeh-ye Do and Qajarīyeh Do; also known as Qājāniyeh, Qājār, and Qajarīyeh) is a village in Esmailiyeh Rural District, in the Central District of Ahvaz County, Khuzestan Province, Iran. At the 2006 census, its population was 153, in 27 families.

References 

Populated places in Ahvaz County